David Leslie Johnson-McGoldrick (né Johnson) is an American screenwriter and producer of film and television.

Early life 
Johnson began writing plays in the second grade and wrote his first screenplay at age nineteen after graduating from Lexington High School in Lexington, Ohio. He attended Ohio State University in Columbus, Ohio, and graduated with a Bachelor of Fine Arts Degree in Photography and Cinema.

Career
Johnson began his career as a production assistant on Frank Darabont's The Shawshank Redemption, which was filmed on location in Johnson's hometown of Mansfield, Ohio, at the historic Mansfield Reformatory, where Johnson's great-grandfather had been a prison guard. Johnson spent the next five years as Darabont's assistant, using the opportunity to hone his craft as a screenwriter. He wrote at least two scripts for the cancelled Return of the Thing, a four-hour sequel mini-series to John Carpenter's 1982 cult classic The Thing. The project was ultimately cancelled for unknown reasons. He would further work with Darabont on his television series The Walking Dead and Mob City.

Johnson has collaborated several times with filmmaker James Wan, contributing entries in The Conjuring franchise, dramatizations of the real-life cases of Ed and Lorraine Warren, paranormal investigators, as well as the DC Comics film Aquaman and its upcoming sequel. He is also set to write a sequel to The Flash.

Filmography

Film

Television

References

External links 

Living people
21st-century American screenwriters
American male screenwriters
Ohio State University College of Arts and Sciences alumni
People from Mansfield, Ohio
Year of birth missing (living people)
Screenwriters from Ohio
21st-century American male writers